The 2019 Bashkir head election was held on 8 September 2019 in the autonomous republic of Bashkortostan. The result was a victory for Radiy Khabirov who won 82.02% of the vote.

Background 
Since July 2010, Bashkortostan was headed by President Rustem Khamitov. First, he was appointed as an acting president by Dmitry Medvedev after the early resignation of Bashkir President Murtaza Rakhimov, and a few days later, on 19 July 2010, Khamitov was confirmed as the new president of the republic for a 5 year term through the procedure of approval by the deputies of the State Assembly.

In early May 2012, Russian President Dmitry Medvedev signed a law returning direct elections for heads of regions to Russia. The law came into force on 1 June 2012.

On 27 February 2014, amendments were made to the Constitution of the Republic of Bashkortostan, according to which, from 1 January 2015, the post of the President was changed to the Head of the Republic.

In early 2014, Khamitov sought for re-election for presidency. On 30 May 2014, he resigned ahead of schedule and was immediately appointed by Russian President Vladimir Putin as the acting president of Bashkortostan and also received permission to participate in the elections. Snap presidential elections were held on 14 September 2014. From there, Khamitov won 81.8% of the vote with a turnout of 74.9%. He was elected for a 5 year term which was set to expire in September 2019.

On 11 October 2018, at the Day of the Republic of Bashkortostan, Khamitov resigned ahead of the elections, citing as a "personal decision" noting that he wouldn't run for re-election. The acting head of the republic was appointed 54 year old Radiy Khabirov, whom prior to that, was the head of the Krasnogorsk City District in Moscow Oblast.

Results

References

Bashkir
September 2019 events in Russia
Politics of Bashkortostan